Benjamin Kessel (born 1 October 1987) is a German former professional footballer who played as a right-back.

Career
Kessel joined Eintracht Braunschweig, then in the 3. Liga, in 2010 from the reserve side of 1. FSV Mainz 05. With Braunschweig he won promotion into the 2. Bundesliga in 2011 and into the Bundesliga in 2013. On 31 August 2013, Kessel made his debut in the German first-tier, in a match against Hamburger SV.

After the 2014–15 2. Bundesliga season, Kessel joined Union Berlin on a free transfer. Following a 2016–17 season plagued by injuries, Kessel's contract at the club was not extended.

In May 2017, Kessel announced his decision to return to his former club 1. FC Kaiserslautern signing a two-year contract.

In January 2019, he returned to former side Eintracht Braunschweig from 1. FC Saarbrücken having agreed a two-year contract with an option.

In 2021, he ended his professional career and started working at the youth ranks of Eintracht Braunschweig.

References

External links
 
 
 

1987 births
Living people
People from Bad Kreuznach
Footballers from Rhineland-Palatinate
German footballers
Association football defenders
Bundesliga players
2. Bundesliga players
3. Liga players
BFV Hassia Bingen players
1. FC Kaiserslautern II players
1. FC Kaiserslautern players
Wormatia Worms players
1. FSV Mainz 05 II players
Eintracht Braunschweig players
Eintracht Braunschweig II players
1. FC Union Berlin players
1. FC Saarbrücken players